Edwin Gyasi (born 1 July 1991) is a Netherlands-born Ghanaian footballer who plays as a midfielder.

Gyasi formerly played for Aalesund, Telstar, De Graafschap, FC Twente and Heracles Almelo. He is a brother of fellow footballer Raymond Gyasi.

International career
Born in the Netherlands to Ghanaian parents, Gyasi made his senior debut for the Ghana national football team in a 5-1 2018 FIFA World Cup qualification win over Congo on 5 September 2017.

Career statistics

Club

International

Statistics accurate as of match played 16 September 2018

International goals
Scores and results list Ghana's goal tally first.

References

External links

 Voetbal International profile 

1991 births
Living people
Association football wingers
Footballers from Amsterdam
Ghanaian footballers
Dutch footballers
SC Telstar players
De Graafschap players
FC Twente players
Heracles Almelo players
Roda JC Kerkrade players
Aalesunds FK players
PFC CSKA Sofia players
FC Dallas players
Samsunspor footballers
Boluspor footballers
Beitar Jerusalem F.C. players
FK Kukësi players
Eredivisie players
Eerste Divisie players
Eliteserien players
First Professional Football League (Bulgaria) players
Major League Soccer players
TFF First League players
Israeli Premier League players
Kategoria Superiore players
Ghana international footballers
Citizens of Ghana through descent
Dutch sportspeople of Ghanaian descent
Dutch expatriate footballers
Expatriate footballers in Norway
Expatriate footballers in Bulgaria
Expatriate soccer players in the United States
Expatriate footballers in Turkey
Expatriate footballers in Israel
Expatriate footballers in Albania
Dutch expatriate sportspeople in Norway
Dutch expatriate sportspeople in Bulgaria
Dutch expatriate sportspeople in the United States
Dutch expatriate sportspeople in Turkey
Dutch expatriate sportspeople in Israel
Dutch expatriate sportspeople in Albania
Ghanaian expatriate sportspeople in Norway
Ghanaian expatriate sportspeople in Bulgaria
Ghanaian expatriate sportspeople in the United States
Ghanaian expatriate sportspeople in Turkey
Ghanaian expatriate sportspeople in Israel
Ghanaian expatriate sportspeople in Albania